This is about the museum in Taiwan; for the one in China see Aurora Art Museum (Shanghai).

The Aurora Art Museum is an art museum in Songshan District, Taipei, Taiwan. The museum is located in the Aurora 21st Century Building.

History
The museum was founded in 2003 by the AURORA Group Chairman Chen Yung-tai to showcase thousands of exhibits he has collected over the past decades.

Exhibitions
The museums exhibits jade objects, bronze wares and Buddhism-related artifacts.

Activities
The museum staffs conduct studies in collaboration with the Center of Ancient Civilizations at Peking University and offer online lectures on traditional Chinese cultures.

Transportation
The museum is accessible within walking distance East from Nanjing East Road Station of the Taipei Metro.

See also
 List of museums in Taiwan

References

External links
  

2003 establishments in Taiwan
Art museums and galleries in Taiwan
Art museums established in 2003
Museums in Taipei